Falsozorispiella albosignata is a species of beetle in the family Cerambycidae, and the only species in the genus Falsozorispiella. It was described by Pic in 1945.

References

Apomecynini
Beetles described in 1945
Monotypic Cerambycidae genera